Ordinary Man (stylised as ØRD†NARY MAN) is the twelfth  studio album by English heavy metal singer Ozzy Osbourne. It was released on 21 February 2020 through Epic Records. It was produced by Andrew Watt and Louis Bell. The album marks the first time that Osbourne collaborated with Watt and Bell. It also marks the longest gap between two albums from Osbourne to date, spanning almost ten years since Scream. The first single of the album, "Under the Graveyard", was released on 8 November 2019. The second single, "Straight to Hell", was released on 22 November 2019. The third single and title track featuring singer Elton John was released on 10 January 2020. The fourth single "It's a Raid" featuring Post Malone was released on 20 February 2020, a day before the release of the album.

The album received mainly positive reviews, with many considering it Osbourne's best album in years and favorably comparing it to both his early solo work and Black Sabbath.

Four days after the album's release, Osbourne announced that he had started working on its follow-up, with Andrew Watt returning as producer. The follow-up was announced as Patient Number 9 and was released on 9 September 2022. A re-recorded version of the Japanese bonus track "Darkside Blues" later appeared as the closing track on the album.

Background
Ordinary Man is Osbourne's first studio album as a solo artist in ten years following Scream (2010). It is also his first album overall since he reunited with Black Sabbath's Tony Iommi and Geezer Butler for their final album 13 (2013), with him as lead singer. After the release of 13, they went on a farewell tour titled The End Tour, which ended in Birmingham, England on 4 February 2017. After Black Sabbath concluded their farewell tour, Osbourne kept working on new material. In September 2019, he was featured alongside American rapper Travis Scott on American rapper Post Malone's "Take What You Want", from Malone's third studio album Hollywood's Bleeding, which went on to become Osbourne's first Billboard Hot 100 top 10 in over 30 years, thus making it the longest gap between top 10 appearances in the chart's history. On 8 November 2019, it was revealed that Osbourne had worked with Guns N' Roses bassist Duff McKagan, and Red Hot Chili Peppers drummer Chad Smith on the album. Speaking about the recording, he commented that the entire album process is done "in just a short time", adding "Duff and Chad came in and we would go in and jam during the day and I would go work out the songs in the evenings. I previously had said to Sharon I should be doing an album, but in the back of my mind I was going, 'I haven't got the fucking strength.' But Andrew pulled it out of me. I really hope people listen to it and enjoy it, because I put my heart and soul into this album."

Critical reception

Ordinary Man received generally positive reviews from contemporary music critics. At Metacritic, which assigns a normalised rating out of 100 to reviews from mainstream publications, the album received an average score of 78, based on 15 reviews, indicating "generally favorable reviews". Aggregator AnyDecentMusic? gave it 7.4 out of 10, based on their assessment of the critical consensus.

AllMusic critic Fred Thomas gave the album a mostly positive review, writing that although it had a few weaker songs, it was Osbourne's best album in years. He wrote: "The production is huge but the energy is spontaneous, sounding like it was as fun to make as it is to listen to. 71 years old at the time Ordinary Man was released, Osbourne's voice is in great shape, sounding more or less like he always has. How he's making music this strong after riding the crazy train for more than half-a-century is anyone's guess, but the better songs here rank among his best." Josh Gray of Clash wrote that "Ordinary Man is far from perfect, but all Ozzy Osbourne's solo releases tend to reflect their creator's flaws to one degree or another. It does, however, absolutely succeed on its own terms, serving its purpose by reminding the world just what we'll miss when this titan among titans finally departs us for good." He also complimented the energy Osbourne expresses on the album. Spencer Kaufman of Consequence of Sound gave the album a positive review, praising Osbourne's vocals as well as the album's "musicianship", although stating that "songs like 'Goodbye', 'Eat Me', and 'Scary Little Green Men' get lost in the shuffle". Kaufman also stated that he was a bit disappointed that Osborne's longtime guitarist Zakk Wylde wasn't involved in the making of the album. Writing for Evening Standard, Harry Fletcher praised the album, complimenting Osbourne's vocals as well as the features on the album. Joe Smith-Engelhardt of Exclaim! gave Ordinary Man a positive review, saying that it was one of the most captivating albums Osbourne has made in years and "despite small flaws with select songs, he's created another record worthy of people's attention." Writing for musicOMH, Ross Horton was positive towards the album, stating that it is "just another Ozzy Osbourne solo album, for better and worse. It succeeds in its rawness, its slapdash cobbling together of predictable riffs and lunatic poetry."

NME writer Jordan Bassett gave Ordinary Man a perfect score, writing that several songs on the album were reminiscent of Osbourne's old band, Black Sabbath, and that he was having "an absolute ball" on the record. Conversely, writing for Rolling Stone, Kory Grow gave the album a positive review, saying that "Some of the songs are elegiac, some are packed with comic-book laughs, but throughout the album he [Osbourne] sings with a youthful vivacity that seems at odds with his 70-something years. His goofball songs are more lighthearted than ever, and his more serious songs sound even more thoughtful." Grow also mentions that Osbourne's "voice aches is incredibly moving" and that the tender moments of the album makes it a "keeper". Furthermore, writing for The Guardian, Michael Hann gave the album an overall mixed review, implying that "Ordinary Man may have its lachrymose moments lyrically", although stating that the album "perhaps" has "too few memorable songs". A.D. Amorosi of Variety gave the album a positive review, saying that it contains "More hard rock than rough metal, and more lavishly produced (by Andrew Watt, of Cardi B's Invasion of Privacy, and Post Malone's Beerbongs & Bentleys fame) than Ozzy's sludge-glam sound of his past". Furthermore, he believe that Ordinary Man "is like driving a clown car through a wake. It's great, fast fun even when it's sad".

Metal Hammer named it as the 32nd best metal album of 2020.

Commercial performance
Ordinary Man debuted at number 3 on the US Billboard 200 with 77,000 equivalent units, including 65,000 pure album sales. This is Osbourne's eighth top ten album on the chart as a solo artist and equals the peak of his 2007 album Black Rain. The album also debuted at number 3 on the UK Albums Chart, his highest-ever solo placing on the chart.

Track listing

Personnel
Credits adapted from AllMusic.

 Ozzy Osbourne – lead vocals, harmonica (tracks 6, 12), composition

Additional musicians
 Andrew Watt – vocals, guitars, keyboards (tracks 2, 4-10), piano (track 4), bass (track 7), programming, production, composition, instrumentation, string arrangements, choir arrangement, back cover photography
 Louis Bell – keyboards (track 10), production, engineering, programming, composition, instrumentation, vocal production
 Duff McKagan – bass (tracks 1-4, 6, 8-10), composition
 Chad Smith – drums, percussion (tracks 1-11), composition
 Slash – guitar (tracks 1, 4)
 Tom Morello – guitar (tracks 8, 10)
 Charlie Puth – keyboards (tracks 1, 2, 5, 9)
 Elton John – piano and co-lead vocals (track 4)
 Post Malone – co-lead vocals (tracks 10, 11), composition
 Travis Scott – vocals (track 11), composition
 Kelly Osbourne – background vocals (track 6)
 Michael Dore – bass
 Nicholas Garrett – bass
 Peter Snipp – bass
 Richard Pryce – double bass
 Stacey Watton – double bass
 Charlie Schein – guitar
 Happy Perez – keyboards (tracks 5, 8), additional production, instrumentation, programming
 Ali Tamposi – vocals, composition
 Billy Walsh – composition
 Holly Laessig – background vocals
 Jess Wolfe – background vocals

 John Bowen – tenor vocals
 Christopher Hann – tenor vocals
 Gareth Treseder – tenor vocals
 Hannah Cooke – alto
 Jo Marshall – alto
 Amy Lyddon – alto
 Clara Sanabras – alto
 Sara Davey – soprano
 Grace Davidson – soprano
 Joanna Forbes L'Estrange – soprano
 Lizzie Ball – violin
 Perry Montague-Mason – violin, strings
 Mark Berrow – violin
 John Bradbury – violin
 Jackie Hartley – violin
 Patrick Kiernan – violin
 Boguslav Kostecki – violin
 Gaby Lester – violin
 Dorina Markoff – violin
 Steve Morris – violin
 Everton Nelson – violin
 Tom Pigott-Smith – violin
 Christopher Tombling – violin
 Deborah Widdup – violin
 Susan Dench – viola, vocals
 Julia Knight – viola, vocals
 Peter Lale – viola, vocals
 Andy Parker – viola, vocals
 Ian Burdge – viola, cello
 Nick Cooper – viola, cello
 Vicky Matthews – viola, cello
 Chris Worsey – viola, cello

Additional personnel
 Andrew Dudman – engineering
 Dominik Gryzbon – engineering
 Paul Lamalfa – engineering
 Matt Still – engineering
 Matt Jones – engineering assistance
 George Oulton – engineering assistance
 Kevin Peterson – mastering engineering assistance
 Mike Bozzi – mastering
 Dave Kutch – mastering
 Manny Marroquin – mixing
 Alan Moulder – mixing
 Caesar Edmunds – mixing assistance, instrumentation, programming, synth programming (track 1), synth bass (tracks 2, 3, 6, 9, 10)
 Scott Desmarais – mixing assistance
 Robin Florent – mixing assistance
 Chris Galland – mixing assistance
 Tom Herbert – mixing assistance
 Jeremie Inhaber – mixing assistance
 Kaan Gunesberk – programming (track 11)
 Wil Malone – choir arrangement, string arrangements, string conduction
 Amy Stewart – strings conduction
 Jon Contino – illustrations
 Jeff Schulz – art direction, design
 Terry Edwards – choir, chorus master
 Ben Parry – choir, chorus master
 London Voices – choir, chorus
 Sam Taylor-Johnson – photography

Charts

Weekly charts

Year-end charts

Certifications

References

External links
 
 Osbourne hosting a Reddit AMA on his life and the album

2020 albums
Ozzy Osbourne albums
Albums produced by Andrew Watt (record producer)
Albums produced by Louis Bell
Epic Records albums